Ditrigona policharia is a moth in the family Drepanidae. It was described by Oberthür in 1923. It is found in China.

The wingspan is about 21.5 mm. The fore- and hindwings are lustrous white, the forewings with the costa pale yellowish brown at the base, the remainder white. There are pale grey broad fasciae, straight and faintly marked, consisting of two closely opposed medial fasciae crossing the distal end of the cell. There are two or more fasciae proximal to the medial pair, and three nearly parallel fasciae distal to the medial pair. The hindwings are similar to the forewings, but with only one distinct fascia proximal to the medial pair.

References

Moths described in 1923
Drepaninae
Moths of Asia
Taxa named by Charles Oberthür